Julio César Antúnez Amorín (born January 9, 1956 in Montevideo, Uruguay) is a former Uruguayan footballer and manager who played for clubs of Uruguay, Chile and Ecuador and managed in clubs of Uruguay, Chile, Ecuador and Guatemala.

References

External links
 Profile at Julioantunez.com Profile at

1956 births
Living people
Uruguayan footballers
Uruguayan expatriate footballers
Uruguayan football managers
Club Atlético River Plate (Montevideo) players
Liverpool F.C. (Montevideo) players
L.D.U. Quito footballers
Trasandino footballers
Deportes Temuco footballers
Deportes Iquique footballers
C.D. Aviación footballers
C.D. Arturo Fernández Vial footballers
Chilean Primera División players
Expatriate footballers in Chile
Expatriate footballers in Ecuador
Expatriate football managers in Chile
Expatriate football managers in Ecuador
Expatriate football managers in Guatemala
Uruguayan expatriate sportspeople in Ecuador
Association football defenders
Liverpool F.C. (Montevideo) managers
River Plate Montevideo managers
Rampla Juniors managers
C.A. Cerro managers
C.A. Bella Vista managers
El Tanque Sisley managers